Frolov Ridge is a prominent ridge about  long, trending north–south, located just west of Arruiz Glacier in the Bowers Mountains of Victoria Land, Antarctica. It was photographed from the air by U.S. Navy Operation Highjump, 1946–47, was surveyed by the Soviet Antarctic Expedition in 1958 and was named after V.V. Frolov, a Soviet polar investigator, and director of the Arctic and Antarctic Scientific Research Institute. The ridge lies situated on the Pennell Coast, a portion of Antarctica lying between Cape Williams and Cape Adare.

References

Ridges of Victoria Land
Pennell Coast